Paan Gali is a bazaar in Lahore, Pakistan that is known for selling goods imported from India. It is located within Anarkali Baazaar and comprises three lanes and around fifty shops.

Paan Gali became a centre of selling Indian goods after the partition of India in 1947.

Vendors in the market sell paan, sarees, coconuts, beauty products, ayurvedic medicines, and kitchen utensils. Rafiq Abbas, a local shopkeeper of Paan Gali, has described the popularity of the locality:

Paan Gali is said to bear a resemblance to Chandni Chowk of Delhi.

References 

Data Gunj Bakhsh Zone
Bazaars in Lahore
Market towns in Pakistan
Tourist attractions in Lahore
Shopping districts and streets in Pakistan